Saraland City Schools (SCS) is a school district serving and operated by Saraland, Alabama, United States.

The district consists of four schools, Saraland Early Education Center, Saraland Elementary School, Saraland (formerly Adams) Middle School, and Saraland High School.

The high school students feed into Saraland Middle School; the students will be rezoned to Saraland High School in January 2010.

 non-residents wishing to send their children to Saraland schools must pay $1,500 every year per child.

History
In June 2006, the Saraland residents voted in favor (70%) to break away from the Mobile County Public Schools.

School uniforms
The district requires its students to wear school uniforms.

References

External links

 Saraland City Schools

School districts in Alabama
Education in Mobile County, Alabama
School districts established in 2006
2006 establishments in Alabama